Ashland County is a county located in the northeastern portion of the U.S. state of Ohio. As of the 2020 census, the population was 52,447. Its county seat and largest city is Ashland. The county is named for "Ashland", the home of Senator Henry Clay near Lexington, Kentucky. It was formed in 1846 from parts of Huron, Lorain, Richland and Wayne Counties.

Ashland County comprises the Ashland, OH Metropolitan Statistical Area, which is also included in the Mansfield-Ashland-Bucyrus, OH Combined Statistical Area.

History
Ashland County was formed on February 24, 1846, from portions of Huron, Lorain, Richland, and Wayne counties. Like the county seat, it was named after Ashland, the Lexington, Kentucky-area home of Henry Clay, a Kentucky senator.  Henry Clay was very popular in the area of north central Ohio due to the role he played in defusing the secession crisis of 1820 and the Nullification crisis of 1833. The region was settled overwhelmingly by migrants from New England, and was culturally continuous with early New England. Part of this meant political support for Henry Clay, opposition to slavery and opposition to secession during the aforementioned crises. 
Similarly, this meant the Whig Party was very popular in the region during that era. The first non-Native American settlers in the area that became Ashland County were a group of families from Windham County, Connecticut.  Subsequent migration from 1800 to the mid 1820s came almost exclusively from the regions of rural Massachusetts, New Hampshire and Maine.

Geography

Adjacent counties
Lorain County (north)
Medina County (northeast)
Wayne County (east)
Holmes County (southeast)
Knox County (southwest)
Richland County (west)
Huron County (northwest)

Demographics

2000 census
As of the census of 2000, there were 52,523 people, 19,524 households, and 14,018 families living in the county. The population density was 124 people per square mile (48/km2). There were 20,832 housing units at an average density of 49 per square mile (19/km2). The racial makeup of the county was 97.54% White, 0.81% Black or African American, 0.11% Native American, 0.55% Asian, 0.03% Pacific Islander, 0.21% from other races, and 0.76% from two or more races. 0.65% of the population were Hispanic or Latino of any race. 36.8% were of German, 27.4% English and 8.8% Irish ancestry according to Census 2000. 96.1% spoke English, 1.2% German and 1.0% Spanish as their first language.

There were 19,524 households, out of which 32.50% had children under the age of 18 living with them, 59.50% were married couples living together, 8.50% had a female householder with no husband present, and 28.20% were non-families. 24.00% of all households were made up of individuals, and 10.30% had someone living alone who was 65 years of age or older. The average household size was 2.58 and the average family size was 3.06.

In the county, the population was spread out, with 25.70% under the age of 18, 10.80% from 18 to 24, 26.50% from 25 to 44, 23.00% from 45 to 64, and 13.90% who were 65 years of age or older. The median age was 36 years. For every 100 females there were 96.60 males. For every 100 females age 18 and over, there were 92.40 males.

The median income for a household in the county was $39,179, and the median income for a family was $46,306. Males had a median income of $32,585 versus $22,334 for females. The per capita income for the county was $17,308. About 7.10% of families and 9.50% of the population were below the poverty line, including 13.10% of those under age 18 and 7.50% of those age 65 or over.

2010 census
As of the 2010 United States Census, there were 53,139 people, 20,196 households, and 14,017 families living in the county. The racial makeup of the county was 97.3% white, 0.7% black or African American, 0.5% Asian, 0.2% American Indian, 0.1% Pacific islander, 0.2% from other races, and 1.0% from two or more races. Those of Hispanic or Latino origin made up 0.9% of the population. In terms of ancestry, 32.7% were German, 26.2% were English, 11.2% were Irish, and 5.2% were Italian.

Of the 20,196 households, 30.9% had children under the age of 18 living with them, 55.6% were married couples living together, 9.4% had a female householder with no husband present, 30.6% were non-families, and 25.3% of all households were made up of individuals. The average household size was 2.53 and the average family size was 3.02. The median age was 39.3 years.

The median income for a household in the county was $44,542 and the median income for a family was $54,177. Males had a median income of $39,663 versus $31,012 for females. The per capita income for the county was $20,558. About 10.2% of families and 15.6% of the population were below the poverty line, including 26.6% of those under age 18 and 7.9% of those age 65 or over.

Politics
Prior to 1912, Ashland County was a Democratic Party stronghold in presidential elections voting Republicans only once since 1856. The county was a national bellwether from 1912 to 1936, but starting with the 1940 election, the county has become a Republican Party stronghold. Lyndon B. Johnson's win in 1964 is the lone time since then that a Democrat has won the county.

|}

Transportation
The Ashland County Airport is located three nautical miles (3.5 mi, 5.6 km) northeast of the central business district of the City of Ashland.

Park District
The Ashland County Park District was founded in 2002. Stephanie Featheringill is the current director. The park district currently consists of 18 parks throughout the county. Monthly bird walks are held at  Byers Woods Park (located on 675 County Road 1754, Ashland, OH 44805) on the fourth Saturday of the month. A full list of seasonal events can be found through the park district webpage.

Communities

City
 Ashland (county seat)

Villages

 Bailey Lakes
 Hayesville
 Jeromesville
 Loudonville
 Mifflin
 Perrysville
 Polk
 Savannah

Townships

 Clear Creek
 Green
 Hanover
 Jackson
 Lake
 Mifflin
 Milton
 Mohican
 Montgomery
 Orange
 Perry
 Ruggles
 Sullivan
 Troy
 Vermillion

https://web.archive.org/web/20160715023447/http://www.ohiotownships.org/township-websites

Census-designated place
 Cinnamon Lake

Unincorporated communities
 Albion
 Mohicanville
 Nankin
 Nova
 Paradise Hill
 Redhaw
 Rowsburg
 Ruggles
 Sullivan
 Widowville

See also
National Register of Historic Places listings in Ashland County, Ohio

References

External links

Ashland County Government's website

 
1846 establishments in Ohio
Populated places established in 1846